The  was an army of the Imperial Japanese Army during the final days of World War II.

History
The Japanese Army of Tokyo Bay was formed 19 June 1945, under the 12th area army as part of the last desperate defense effort by the Empire of Japan to deter possible landings of Allied forces in Kantō region. The Army of Tokyo Bay was based in Tateyama, Chiba. It consisted mostly of poorly trained reservists, conscripted students and Volunteer Fighting Corps home guard militia. It was demobilized at the surrender of Japan on August 15, 1945, without having seen combat.

References and notes
This article incorporates material from Japanese Wikipedia page 東京湾兵団, accessed 22 July 2016

Army of Tokyo Bay
Military units and formations established in 1945
Military units and formations disestablished in 1945